Jaelin Parker, known professionally as Baby Smoove is an American rapper and singer from Detroit, Michigan. He is noted by Ben Dandridge-Lemco of The Fader for his "slick one-liners and clever storytelling delivered in a subdued, almost disinterested, flow."

Early life 
Jaelin Parker was born December 3rd, 1996, and raised on the east side of Detroit, Michigan. He recalls growing up in a poorer neighborhood of Detroit and wishing to be suburban. He also recalls skipping school and not socializing a lot when younger. He graduated from High School in 2014.

Career 
Smoove recalls recording in a studio for the first time at age 15. In 2018, he created a CD mixtape titled Why so Serious which he recalls not gaining attention. In 2019, he released his single "CardoGotWings" on streaming platform SoundCloud which garnered attention from online music publication Pitchfork who selected the song as "The must-hear rap song of the day". In July 2020, Smoove released his project I'm Still Perfect. His project is noted by Jordan Darville of The Fader as being stylistically similar to American rapper Drakeo the Ruler. In December 2020, he released his mixtape Hardwood Classic with production from Detroit record producer Enrgy. In April 2021, he appeared on American rapper Lil Yachty's album Michigan Boy Boat on the track "Don't Even Bother" alongside rapper Veeze. In August 2022, he released his single "Embarrassing" alongside an accompanying music video.

References

External links 
 

African-American male rappers
21st-century American male musicians
Living people
People from Detroit
Rappers from Detroit
Year of birth missing (living people)